Girls at Arms is a 1975 Danish comedy film directed by Finn Henriksen, and starring Dirch Passer. It was followed by a sequel Girls at Arms 2 the following year.

Cast
 Dirch Passer as 1st Sergeant Vasby
 Birte Tove as Marianne Valdorff
 Helle Merete Sørensen as Vibsen
 Ulla Jessen as Magda Gammelgaard
 Marianne Tønsberg as Irmgard Martinsen
 Kirsten Walther as Senior Sergeant Meldgård
 Karl Stegger as Major Basse
 Paul Hagen as Lieutenant / Military Psychologist Praas
 Per Pallesen as Sergeant Martinsen
 Ole Monty as Colonel Valdorff
 Lene Axelsen as Nina
 Tina Holmer as Karin
 Magi Stocking as Børgesen
 Torben Jensen as Victor Valdorff
 Lars Høy as Holger

References

External links
 

1975 films
1970s Danish-language films
1975 comedy films
Films directed by Finn Henriksen
Danish comedy films